Six Royal Navy ships have borne the name HMS Southampton. All were named after Southampton, a port on the south coast of England.

 was a 48-gun fourth rate launched in 1693. The ship was rebuilt in 1700, hulked at Jamaica in 1728 and finally broken up in 1771.
 was a 32-gun fifth rate launched in 1757, and wrecked in 1812. 
 was a 60-gun fourth rate launched in 1820. In 1867 the ship was lent to the Hull Committee, finally being sold in 1912.
 was a  cruiser, launched in 1912 and sold in 1926. She fought at the Battle of Jutland.
 was a  cruiser, launched in 1936 and sunk off Malta on 11 January 1941.
 was a Type 42 destroyer, launched in 1979 and decommissioned in 2009.

Honours
Emeraude 1757
Belle Isle 1761
The Glorious First of June 1794
St Vincent 1797
Heligoland 1914
Dogger Bank 1915
Jutland 1916
Norway 1940
Spartivento 1940
Malta Convoys 1941

References

Gossett, William Patrick (1986) The lost ships of the Royal Navy, 1793-1900. (London: Mansell). 

Royal Navy ship names